David L. Knutson (born November 24, 1959) is an American politician and judge in the state of Minnesota.

Knutson graduated from Burnsville High School in Burnsville, Minnesota. Knutson graduated from St. Olaf College and from William Mitchell College of Law. He lives in Burnsville, Minnesota with his wife and family and practiced law in Burnsville. He served in the Minnesota State Senate from 1993 to 2004 and was a Republican. Knutson served as a Minnesota District Court judge from 2004 to the present time. His father Howard A. Knutson also served in the Minnesota Legislature.

References

1959 births
Living people
People from Burnsville, Minnesota
St. Olaf College alumni
William Mitchell College of Law alumni
Minnesota lawyers
Minnesota state court judges
Republican Party Minnesota state senators